Simler Hall (also known as Building 836) is the oldest building on Maxwell Air Force Base in Montgomery, Alabama.  Built in 1927, it now serves as the headquarters for the Community College of the Air Force.  It is named for General George B. Simler, the commander of the Air Training Command and primary proponent of the creation of the CCAF.  It was listed on the National Register of Historic Places in 1988.

References

Buildings and structures completed in 1927
Air University (United States Air Force)
Buildings and structures in Montgomery, Alabama
National Register of Historic Places in Montgomery, Alabama